Gölmarmara is a town and district of Manisa Province in Turkey's Aegean at a distance of  from the province center of Manisa. The town owes its name to the nearby Lake Marmara, called under various names throughout history. The town of Gölmarmara itself was a mere village in Ottoman times cited under such names as "Marmaracık" or "Mermere". It was made into a township with its own municipality depending the district center of Akhisar at the time of the foundation of the Turkish Republic (1923) and in 1987 a district center by its own right and under the same name, Gölmarmara.

According to the 2000 census, the population of the district is 17,831, of which 11,205 live in the town of Gölmarmara. The annual rate of increase in population for Gölmarmara town is 0.206% while an annual decrease of 0.381% was registered for its depending villages.

Lake Marmara, aside from being a recreational center for the province as a whole, is also an important source for fishing and agricultural irrigation.

There are six primary schools and two high schools in Gölmarmara, with a total teacher's corpus of 117 and a student's corpus of 3,094. A small professional higher school depending Celal Bayar University is also located in Gölmarmara, its academic corpus composed of six teachers providing education higher education with a professional focus to 144 students.

The town's most important historical building is Halime Hatun Religious Complex built by the Ottoman sultan Mehmed III during his tenure in Manisa (1583-1595) in the name of his wet nurse and his future grand vizier Tekeli Lala Mehmed Pasha's mother-in-law Halime Hatun.

In 2015 an important archaeological discovery was made at Kaymakçı: a Middle and Late Bronze Age city (2000-1200 BC) whose area was approximately 4 times larger than that of Troy.

Notes

References

External links

 Road map of Gölmarmara and environs

Manisa
Populated places in Manisa Province
Districts of Manisa Province
Archaeological sites of prehistoric Anatolia